Chama is a genus of cemented saltwater clams, marine bivalve molluscs in the family Chamidae, the jewel boxes.

Species
Extant species within this genus include:

 Chama ambigua Lischke, 1870
 Chama arcana F. R. Bernard, 1987
 Chama asperella Lamarck, 1819
 Chama brassica Reeve, 1847
 Chama buddiana C.B. Adams, 1852
 Chama cerinorhodon Hamada & Matsukuma, 2005
 Chama cerion Matsukuma, Paulay & Hamada, 2003
 Chama circinata di Monterosato, 1878
 Chama congregata Conrad, 1833
 Chama coralloides Reeve, 1846
 Chama crenulata Lamarck, 1819
 Chama croceata Lamarck, 1819
 Chama dunkeri Lischke, 1870
 Chama echinata Broderip, 1835
 Chama florida Lamarck, 1819
 Chama frondosa Broderip, 1835
 Chama gryphoides Linnaeus, 1758
 Chama hicksi Valentich-Scott & Coan, 2010
 Chama isaacooki Healy, Lamprell & Stanisic, 1993
 Chama lactuca Dall, 1886
 Chama lazarus Linnaeus, 1758
 Chama limbula Lamarck, 1819
 Chama linguafelis Reeve, 1847
 Chama lobata Broderip, 1835
 Chama macerophylla Gmelin, 1791
 Chama oomedusae Matsukuma, 1996
 Chama pacifica Broderip, 1835
 Chama pellucida Broderip, 1835
 Chama producta Broderip, 1835
 Chama pulchella Reeve, 1846
 Chama rubropicta Bartsch & Rehder, 1939
 Chama ruderalis Lamarck, 1819
 Chama sarda Reeve, 1847
 Chama sinuosa Broderip, 1835
 Chama sordida Broderip, 1835
 Chama tinctoria F. R. Bernard, 1976
 Chama venosa Reeve, 1847
 Chama yaroni Delsaerdt, 1986

Extinct species
Extinct species within this genus include:

 Chama asperella†  Lamarck, 1819
 Chama aspersa†  Reeve, 1846
 Chama berjadinensis†  Hodson, 1927
 Chama bezanconi † Cossmann, 1887
 Chama brassica†  Reeve, 1847
 Chama calcarata†  Lamarck, 1806
 Chama callipona†  Maury, 1924
 Chama chipolana†  Dall, 1903
 Chama corticosaformis†  Weisbord, 1929
 Chama eudeila†  Maury, 1924
 Chama fimbriata†  Defrance, 1817
 Chama fragum†  Reeve, 1847
 Chama huttoni†  Hector, 1886
 Chama involuta†  Guppy, 1873
 Chama lamellifera†  Tenison Woods, 1877
 Chama monroensis†  Aldrich, 1903
 Chama nejdensis†  Abbass, 1972
 Chama pacifica†  Broderip, 1834
 Chama pittensis†  Marwick, 1928
 Chama radiata†  Dockery, 1977
 Chama reflexa†  Reeve, 1846
 Chama ruderalis†  Lamarck, 1819
 Chama scheibei†  Anderson, 1929
 Chama strepta†  Woodring, 1982

This genus is known in the fossil record from the Cretaceous period to the Quaternary period (age range 130.0 to 0.0 million years ago.). Fossil shells within this genus have been found all over the world.

References

Chamidae
Bivalve genera